Vasil Stoyanov Mitkov (17 September 1943 – 17 March 2002) was a Bulgarian footballer who played as a winger. He played for Spartak Sofia and Levski Sofia, and was also capped for the Bulgarian national team. He represented the nation at the 1970 World Cup.

Honours

Club
Spartak Sofia
Bulgarian Cup: 1967–68

Levski Sofia
 Bulgarian League (2): 1969–70, 1973–74
 Bulgarian Cup (2): 1969–70, 1970–71

References

External links
FIFA profile
Vasil Mitkov's profile at LevskiSofia 

1943 births
2002 deaths
Bulgarian footballers
Bulgaria international footballers
PFC Levski Sofia players
First Professional Football League (Bulgaria) players
1970 FIFA World Cup players
Association football midfielders